The Aguanish River is a salmon river of the Côte-Nord region of Quebec. It flows from north to south and empties into the Gulf of Saint Lawrence.

Location

The current has scoured out large cavities in the pink granite river bed, which are called "giant cooking pots".
The mouth of the river is to the southwest of the village of Aguanish, which it passes through, in the municipality of Aguansh, Minganie Regional County Municipality.
The first falls are in the center of the village, just north of the Quebec Route 138 bridge, and can be approached by a trail from the parking lot to the west of the bridge.

Name

The name "Aguanish River" was made official on 11 April 1985.
The name is also given as Goynish River or Aguanus River.
It has been spelled Goines (17th century), Guanis, Goinis (Jacques-Nicolas Bellin map of 1744), Goynish (1776 Carver map), Agwanus, Aguanus or Agouanus (19th century maps).
It probably comes from the Innu language akwanich, meaning "small shelter".
The  Dictionnaire des rivières et lacs de la province de Québec (1914) says Agwanus or Agouanus is a Montagnais word that means "where one unloads" boats.
Some say it means "poor place" or "place with little".
Another theory is it comes from the Innu word akuannis meaning a beaver scooping mud from the river bottom to build its lodge.

Description

According to the Dictionnaire des rivières et lacs de la province de Québec (1914),

Basin

It lies between the basins of the Nabisipi River to the west and the Natashquan River to the east.
It is partly in the unorganized territory of Lac-Jérôme, partly in the municipality of Aguanish.
A map of the ecological regions of Quebec shows the river in sub-regions 6j-T and 6m-T of the east spruce/moss subdomain.

Fish

Fish include brook trout ( (Salvelinus fontinalis)), landlocked Atlantic salmon (Salmo salar) and northern pike (Esox lucius).
The river has been open to sport fishing since 1988.
The Innu of Natashquan have exclusive rights to the  stretch from the mouth to the Trait-de-Scie.
There are six salmon pools below the first falls and three above the second falls.
A 1984 study of the river identified 39 obstacles considered impassible to salmon on the river and its tributaries, with nine on the river itself from kilometre 5 upwards.
The only significant amount of good habitat is upstream from kilometre 137, including the Aguanish North River.

In May 2015 the Ministry of Forests, Wildlife and Parks of Quebec announced a sport fishing catch-and-release program for large salmon on sixteen of Quebec's 118 salmon rivers.
These were the Mitis, Laval, Pigou, Bouleau, aux Rochers, Jupitagon, Magpie, Saint-Jean, Corneille, Piashti, Watshishou, Little Watshishou, Nabisipi, Aguanish and Natashquan rivers.
The Quebec Atlantic Salmon Federation said that the measures did not go nearly far enough in protecting salmon for future generations.
In view of the rapidly declining Atlantic salmon population catch-and-release should have been implemented on all rivers apart from northern Quebec.

See also 
List of rivers of Quebec

Notes

Sources

Rivers of Côte-Nord